Nispal Singh is an Indian producer in Tollywood. He produces films and serials under his banner Surinder Films. He is married to Koel Mallick, a Tollywood actress.

Filmography

Films

Web series

References

External links

 

Living people
Year of birth missing (living people)
Film producers from Kolkata
Bengali film producers
Indian television producers